Ventsislav Aldev (: born 11 August 1977)  is a Bulgarian footballer. He currently plays as a midfielder for Slivnishki geroi.

References

External links
 
 

1977 births
Living people
Bulgarian footballers
First Professional Football League (Bulgaria) players
Second Professional Football League (Bulgaria) players
PFC Belasitsa Petrich players
PFC Vidima-Rakovski Sevlievo players
PFC Marek Dupnitsa players
FC Montana players
Association football midfielders